Locale may refer to:

 Locale (computer software), a set of parameters that defines the user's language, region and any special variant preferences that the user wants to see in their user interface—usually a locale identifier consists of at least a language identifier and a region identifier
 Locale (computer hardware), an abstraction of the concept of a localized set of hardware resources which are close enough to enjoy uniform memory access
 Locale (mathematics), a complete Heyting algebra used in pointless topology
 Locale (geographic), a geographic place where there is or was human activity other than populated places (such as cities, settlements, towns, or villages), mines, and dams
 Locale (Isabelle), a module of the Isabelle proof assistant
 Locale ('Ndrangheta), the main local organizational unit of the 'Ndrangheta with jurisdiction over criminal activities in an entire town or an area in a large urban center

See also 
 Local (disambiguation)
 Location (disambiguation)